Sandy Island Marine Provincial Park, formerly Sandy Island Provincial Park and also known as Tree Island Park, is a 30 hectare provincial park in British Columbia, Canada, located off the north end of Denman Island, on the west side of the Strait of Georgia to the south of Comox. The park comprises Sandy Island (locally known as Tree Island) and the Seal Islets. It is accessible by boat and, at low tide, by foot across tidal flats from Longbeak Point on Denman Island.

In 2012 the park's name was officially changed to Jáji7em and Kw'uhl Marine Park (a.k.a. Sandy Island Marine Park), reflecting the K'omoks names for the islands. Jáji7em ("having trees") refers to Sandy Island, while Kw'uhl (unknown meaning) refers to either the Seal Islets or just Seal Island (a.k.a. Shack Island), the largest of the islets.

References

External links
Sandy Island Marine Provincial Park, BCParks website
BC Parks - Sandy Island Provincial Marine Park, Denman Island, VancouverIsland.com

Provincial Parks of the Gulf Islands
Provincial parks of British Columbia
Protected areas established in 1966
1966 establishments in British Columbia
Marine parks of Canada